Blast: Proletarian Short Stories was a short-lived literary magazine, published in the Bronx from 1933 to 1934. The magazine was edited by Fred Miller, described by his friend William Carlos Williams as then being "out of employment: a tool designer living precariously over a garage in Brooklyn.

William Carlos Williams contributed five stories to Blast. Other contributors included Benjamin Appel, Ilya Ehrenburg and Len Zinberg.

References

Defunct literary magazines published in the United States
Magazines established in 1933
Magazines disestablished in 1934
Magazines published in New York City